Bluelove is the second Korean extended play of South Korean rock band CNBLUE. It was released on May 19, 2010 by FNC Entertainment and distributed by Mnet Media. Before the album was released, "Love Light" was released as the first digital single on May 10, 2010. After it was released "Love" was promoted as the lead single. The album contain five new tracks plus previously released English track, "Let's Go Crazy" from their debut Japanese EP, Now or Never.

The album was released in Taiwan in June 2010 by Warner Music Taiwan in two versions:  import limited edition and commemorate edition.

Promotion and reception
Upon release the album took number one spots on various online charts and peaked at number three on South Korean Gaon Album Chart.

They held their comeback stage on MBC Show! Music Core, performing "Love" and "Black Flower". They won first place on Mnet music show M! Countdown on June 10, 2010, Mutizen award on SBS's Inkigayo on June 20 and again on July 4. "Love" placed #20 on KBS Music Bank 2010 Year End K-Chart.

Track listing

Release history

Charts performance

Sales

References

External links
 CN Blue official YouTube channel

2010 EPs
CNBLUE EPs
Warner Music Taiwan EPs
Korean-language EPs
FNC Entertainment EPs